Kalety  is a town in Tarnowskie Góry County, Silesian Voivodeship, Poland, with 8,607 inhabitants (2019).

Twin towns – sister cities

Kalety is twinned with:
 Ustroń, Poland
 Vítkov, Czech Republic

References

Cities and towns in Silesian Voivodeship
Tarnowskie Góry County
Silesian Voivodeship (1920–1939)